West Puente Valley is an unincorporated community and census-designated place in Los Angeles County, California, USA, northwest of La Puente.  The population was 22,636 at the 2010 census, up from 22,589 at the 2000 census. The community is probably named for its location related to the city of La Puente.

Description 
West Puente Valley is an unincorporated community located in the heart of the San Gabriel Valley, between Downtown Los Angeles and Pomona. The community is easily accessible to the San Gabriel River Freeway to the west, the San Bernardino Freeway to the north, and the Pomona Freeway to the south.

West Puente Valley is bounded by La Puente to the south and east, Baldwin Park to the northwest, West Covina to the northeast, and the San Gabriel River Freeway and the western boundary of City of Industry to the west. The community is mainly residential. The ZIP code that serves the community is 91744 and 91746.

Geography
West Puente Valley is located at  (34.050838, -117.969783).

According to the United States Census Bureau, the community has a total area of 1.8 square miles (4.5 km2), over 99% of it land.

Demographics

2010
At the 2010 census West Puente Valley had a population of 22,636. The racial makeup of West Puente Valley was 11,383 (50.3%) White (4.8% Non-Hispanic White), 471 (2.1%) African American, 256 (1.1%) Native American, 1,650 (7.3%) Asian, 28 (0.1%) Pacific Islander, 7,945 (35.1%) from other races, and 903 (4.0%) from two or more races. Hispanic or Latino of any race were 19,365 persons (85.5%).

The census reported that 22,549 people (99.6% of the population) lived in households, 82 (0.4%) lived in non-institutionalized group quarters, and 5 (0%) were institutionalized.

There were 4,788 households, 2,650 (55.3%) had children under the age of 18 living in them, 2,930 (61.2%) were opposite-sex married couples living together, 910 (19.0%) had a female householder with no husband present, 403 (8.4%) had a male householder with no wife present.  There were 238 (5.0%) unmarried opposite-sex partnerships, and 33 (0.7%) same-sex married couples or partnerships. 426 households (8.9%) were one person and 277 (5.8%) had someone living alone who was 65 or older. The average household size was 4.71.  There were 4,243 families (88.6% of households); the average family size was 4.73.

The age distribution was 6,325 people (27.9%) under the age of 18, 2,647 people (11.7%) aged 18 to 24, 6,154 people (27.2%) aged 25 to 44, 5,028 people (22.2%) aged 45 to 64, and 2,482 people (11.0%) who were 65 or older.  The median age was 32.6 years. For every 100 females, there were 97.0 males.  For every 100 females age 18 and over, there were 97.0 males.

There were 4,898 housing units at an average density of 2,779.6 per square mile, of the occupied units 3,887 (81.2%) were owner-occupied and 901 (18.8%) were rented. The homeowner vacancy rate was 1.2%; the rental vacancy rate was 2.1%.  18,419 people (81.4% of the population) lived in owner-occupied housing units and 4,130 people (18.2%) lived in rental housing units.

According to the 2010 United States Census, West Puente Valley had a median household income of $63,750, with 11.1% of the population living below the federal poverty line.

2000
At the 2000 census there were 22,589 people, 4,834 households, and 4,345 families in the CDP. The population density was 12,908.0 inhabitants per square mile (4,983.8/km2). The racial makeup of the CDP was 43.85% White, 2.46% African American, 1.14% Native American, 7.95% Asian, 0.18% Pacific Islander, 40.00% from other races, and 4.43% from two or more races. Hispanic or Latino of any race were 81.53%.

Of the 4,834 households 46.2% had children under the age of 18 living with them, 67.2% were married couples living together, 15.6% had a female householder with no husband present, and 10.1% were non-families. 8.0% of households were one person and 5.0% were one person aged 65 or older.  The average household size was 4.67 and the average family size was 4.75.

The age distribution was 31.9% under the age of 18, 11.6% from 18 to 24, 29.2% from 25 to 44, 18.0% from 45 to 64, and 9.2% 65 or older.  The median age was 29 years. For every 100 females, there were 98.6 males.  For every 100 females age 18 and over, there were 96.7 males.

The median household income was $49,923 and the median family income  was $50,378. Males had a median income of $30,375 versus $21,601 for females. The per capita income for the CDP was $12,806.  About 9.8% of families and 11.5% of the population were below the poverty line, including 12.9% of those under age 18 and 11.4% of those age 65 or over.

Politics
In the state legislature West Puente Valley is located in the 24th Senate District, represented by Democrat Gloria Romero, and in the 57th Assembly District, represented by Democrat Edward P. Hernandez. Federally, West Puente Valley is located in California's 32nd congressional district, which is represented by Democrat Grace Napolitano.

Education
West Puente Valley is being served by two school districts: The Bassett Unified School District on the western side and the Hacienda La Puente Unified School District on the eastern side.

References

External links
West Puente Valley's community profile

Communities in the San Gabriel Valley
Census-designated places in Los Angeles County, California
La Puente, California